The 22nd Central American Championships in Athletics were held at the Estadio Nacional in San José, Costa Rica, between June 24–26, 2011.

A total of 43 events were contested, 22 by men and 21 by women.

Participation
In addition to the 7 CADICA members, two athletes from Suriname
participated as guests.

Medal summary

Complete results and medal winners were published.

Men

Note
†: Event might have been treated as exhibition because of
the low number of participants.

Women

Note
†: Event might have been treated as exhibition because of
the low number of participants.

Medal table (unofficial)

Note
There are fewer medals in the published medal count.<ref
name = cadica_4/> Men's pole vault, and women's 3000 m steeplechase and 10,000
m race walk might have been treated as exhibition events because of
the low number of participants.

Team trophies
Costa Rica won the overall team trophy.

Total

References

 
International athletics competitions hosted by Costa Rica
Central American Championships in Athletics
Central American Championships in Athletics
Central American Championships in Athletics
Sport in San José, Costa Rica
21st century in San José, Costa Rica